Dmitry Grigoryevich Khvostov (Russian: Дми́трий Григорьевич Хвосто́в; born August 21, 1989) is a Russian professional basketball player for Nizhny Novgorod of the VTB United League. He was part of Russia's bronze medal winning team at the 2012 Summer Olympics.  He is 1.90 m in height and 86 kg in weight.

Professional career
Khvostov was named the Best Russian Young Player in 2009. In 2012, he won the EuroCup championship with Khimki Moscow Region.

On June 26, 2019, Khvostov signed a three-year contract with Zenit Saint Petersburg of the VTB United League.

National team career
Khvostov has been a member of the senior men's Russia national basketball team. He played with Russia's senior team at the EuroBasket 2011, where he won a bronze medal. He also played at the 2012 Summer Olympics, where he won a bronze medal.

References

External links
Dmitry Khvostov at eurobasket.com
Dmitry Khvostov at euroleague.net

1989 births
Living people
2010 FIBA World Championship players
Basketball players at the 2012 Summer Olympics
BC Dynamo Moscow players
BC Khimki players
BC Nizhny Novgorod players
BC Zenit Saint Petersburg players
Medalists at the 2012 Summer Olympics
Medalists at the 2013 Summer Universiade
Olympic basketball players of Russia
Olympic bronze medalists for Russia
Olympic medalists in basketball
PBC Lokomotiv-Kuban players
Point guards
Russian men's basketball players
Sportspeople from Ivanovo
Universiade gold medalists for Russia
Universiade medalists in basketball